The Oregon Ducks men's basketball team is an intercollegiate basketball program that competes in the NCAA Division I and is a member of the Pac-12 Conference, representing the University of Oregon. The Ducks play their home games at Matthew Knight Arena, which has a capacity of 12,364. Then coached by Howard Hobson, Oregon won the first NCAA men's basketball national championship in 1939.  They again reached the Final Four in 2017 under head coach Dana Altman, marking the longest span between appearances in NCAA history (78 years). The Ducks have made the NCAA tournament 17 times, and have won eight conference championships.

History

Early years

The University of Oregon men's basketball team played its first season in 1902–03 with Charles Burden as the head coach. Only two games were played that season with Oregon losing both games. Oregon did not record a win until its fourth season in 1907 against Roseburg. The season ended with a winning record of 4–3, under Hugo Bezdek, who also coached the football team. Bezdek left after that season to coach at Arkansas until 1913 when he went back to Oregon to coach until 1917.

During Bezdek's absence, the basketball team was coached largely by William Hayward, Oregon's track coach. In 1923, William Reinhart took over as the head coach and remained through the erection of McArthur Court until 1935. Coach Reinhart suffered only one losing season at Oregon.

The Tall Firs

Howard Hobson, an alumnus of the university, became the head coach in 1935, following Reinhart's departure. His ideas were considered cutting edge during his years at Oregon and he was well ahead of his time. He ran a fast break offense little used by anyone else in the country at the time and his defenses were an unorthodox hybrid defense. He lobbied for the installment of a shot clock and three-point field goal years before they were first introduced.
In 1939, the Oregon Ducks became the first team to win the NCAA Basketball Championship. Sports editor L. H. Gregory coined the phrase "Tall Firs" to describe the Oregon players due to their taller stature compared to other teams in the country.
The season started with a long trip to the east coast for a series of games, ending with a loss to Stanford back west in San Francisco. The Ducks went 6–3 during that trip but gained valuable experience for the remainder of the season. Oregon went 14–2 to claim the North Division title in the Pacific Coast Conference, which set off a best-of-three playoff against the California Golden Bears. The Ducks won two games straight to claim the conference title.

The Ducks returned to San Francisco for the NCAA regional series where they defeated the Texas Longhorns in the first game 56–41 then the Oklahoma Sooners 55–37. The Ohio State Buckeyes had defeated Wake Forest and Villanova in their regional series to earn their right in the championship game. On March 27, Oregon and Ohio State squared off to claim the national title. Oregon emerged victorious to claim the first NCAA national championship trophy, defeating Ohio State 46–33.

Howard Hobson remained as the head coach until 1947 except for a one-year hiatus during the 1944–45 season, coached by John Warren.

Kamikaze Kids
The six decades following the Tall Firs consisted of an eclectic mix of up and down years, with more down than up. From Hobson's departure in 1947 until 1970, Oregon made only two NCAA Tournament appearances, in 1960 and 1961 under head coach Steve Belko. Those were the days when only one team per conference (usually the conference champion) was guaranteed a bid to the NCAA Tournament.  One of Belko's stars was Stan Love, a gifted shooter and rebounder, who led the Pac-8 in scoring for two straight seasons.  He is the father of current NBA star Kevin Love. In 1971, head coach Dick Harter arrived at Oregon and achieved some consistency with the program. Harter's teams were dubbed the Kamikaze Kids and featured hard play, diving for loose balls, and swarming defense. They were also credited for inspiring the intimidating atmosphere at McArthur Court. While they never earned any conference titles due to UCLA's dominance of the Pac-8 (their best finish was second in 1976–77), they were not without accomplishments. They assembled two 20 win seasons, appeared in three straight NITs, and upset #1 ranked UCLA in 1974.

Harter's only losing season in Oregon was his first. He left in 1978 and the Ducks slid, suffering five consecutive losing seasons. Oregon made an appearance in the NCAA tournament in 1995 under head coach Jerry Green, but otherwise accrued largely mediocre records in the two decades after Harter's departure.

Ernie Kent era
In 1997, Ernie Kent was hired to fill the vacancy at head coach left by Jerry Green. Kent had been one of Harter's Kamikaze Kids, and his teams were known for a similarly up-tempo style of play. In his third season as head coach, he took the Ducks back to the NCAA tournament where they fell in the first round. In 2002, Kent led the Ducks to their first conference championship since 1945, going through the regular season undefeated at home. They earned a number 2 seed in the NCAA Tournament that year and advanced to the Elite Eight by defeating Montana, Wake Forest and Texas. They were eliminated by Kansas and finished the season with a number 11 ranking in the AP Poll. It was Oregon's deepest run in the tournament in 42 years.

Luke Ridnour was selected as the Pac-10 Player of the Year in 2003 as the Ducks won the Pac-10 tournament, defeating the USC Trojans in the conference championship game 74–66. The Ducks entered the NCAA Tournament as an 8 seed and lost to Utah in the first round 58–60.

Oregon made a Final Four appearance in the NIT in 2004 but otherwise made little impact until 2007. Oregon swept its 12 intersectional games to start 2007 and upset #1 ranked UCLA in the third Pac-10 game. The Ducks finished the regular season with a 23–7 record and defeated Arizona, California, and USC to win the 2007 Pac-10 Tournament. The Ducks earned a #3 seed in the NCAA tournament and advanced to the Elite Eight by defeating Miami (Ohio) 58–56, Winthrop 75–61 and University of Nevada, Las Vegas 76–72. On March 25, played and lost to the eventual NCAA National Champions, the Florida Gators, by a score of 77–85.

Oregon was considered the favorite to land Class of 2007 high school stars Kevin Love and Kyle Singler, widely considered to be the greatest high school players to ever come out of Oregon. In the summer of 2005, Love and Singler dropped Oregon from their list because of the turmoil inside the Oregon team, centering on the moral allegations concerning coach Ernie Kent.  Love eventually chose to attend UCLA and Singler chose Duke.

The Ducks were selected as a No. 9 seed in the 2008 NCAA tournament in the Southern Region. They lost to No. 8 seed Mississippi State Bulldogs in first-round play on March 21, 2008, in Little Rock, Arkansas.

On March 15, 2010, the university announced that the decision had been made to fire Ernie Kent as a result of poor performance in the previous two seasons, placing 9th and 10th in conference in the respective years. Kent departed as the longest tenured Pac-10 coach and winningest coach in school history with 235 wins.

Dana Altman era
In April 2010, Dana Altman from Creighton University was hired to replace Ernie Kent after a monthlong search. Altman led the Ducks to a CBI championship in his first year at Oregon and led the Ducks to the Sweet 16 during the 2012–13 season. Altman led the Ducks back to the NCAA Tournament in the 2013–14 season where they defeated BYU but fell to Wisconsin in the round of 32. It was their 12th NCAA tournament appearance and was the first time Oregon won tournament games in back to back seasons in program history. In 2014–15, Altman won his 2nd Pac-12 Coach of the Year in three seasons, as he had won the award in 2013. Altman also broke another school record as he became the first coach in Oregon history to go to three consecutive NCAA Tournaments (2013, 2014, 2015). Altman's success continued into the following season as Oregon won the 2015–16 regular season title, finishing 14–4 in league play. Altman also won the 2015–2016 Pac-12 Coach of the Year for the third time in four years. Lute Olson had been the only other coach in Pac-12 history to win the award three times in a four-year span.

The 2015–16 season was very noteworthy, with the Ducks emerging victorious in the 2015–16 Pac-12 Conference Tournament.  This led to the Ducks being the top seed in the West Regional of the 2015–2016 NCAA tournament, its first ever top seeding in the NCAA tournament.  The Ducks defeated Holy Cross and Saint Joseph's in the first two rounds of the NCAA tournament to advance to the Sweet 16 in Anaheim, where they defeated the number four seed and defending national champion Duke Blue Devils, 82–68, to advance to the Elite 8. The following year, the Ducks would go on to be Pac-12 conference co-champions with Arizona, whom they lost to in the championship game of the Pac-12 Tournament. In that year's NCAA Tournament the Ducks would advance all the way to the Final Four, losing to North Carolina by one point.

Venues and facilities

McArthur Court was constructed in 1926 and the first Oregon basketball game was played in the arena on January 14, 1927, defeating Willamette University 38–10. The arena is located across from Pioneer Cemetery and is named after Clifton McArthur, the first student body president. Even during the Ducks' lean years, it was known as one of the most hostile arenas in the Pac-10. A group of students known as the "Pit Crew" has at times created environments so intimidating that the basket would shake as opponents attempted free throws.

In early 2009, the university broke ground on a new $227 million basketball arena designed by TVA Architects to replace McArthur Court. The new arena was named Matthew Knight Arena, after Phil Knight's son who drowned in a scuba diving accident in 2004. The arena is considered to be the front door to the university due to its high-profile location from where the majority of vehicular traffic into the university stems. A primary goal was to create the best collegiate basketball venue in the country though many criticisms arose due to the funding and price tag associated with the design. The hardwood court was named after Patrick Kilkenny, a booster for the university and the former interim athletic director. It had been the subject of much debate upon its opening, due to its unconventional and artistic design. Designer Tinker Hatfield's idea was to pay tribute to the 1939 national championship team, nicknamed "The Tall Firs", by creating silhouetted firs around the edges of the court. Matthew Knight Arena opened its doors for the first time on January 13, 2011, with the Ducks defeating the University of Southern California 68–62.

Award winners

All-Americans
The following players were named first, second or third-team All-Americans by one of outlets used by the NCAA to determine consensus selections

Pac-12 Player of the Year

Pac-12 Coach of the Year

Postseason

NCAA tournament results
The Ducks have appeared in 17 NCAA tournaments. They won the inaugural NCAA tournament in 1939, winning the National Championship vs. Ohio State. Their combined record is 26–16, with one no–contest in 2021.

NCAA Tournament round history

Historical NCAA Tournament Seeding
The NCAA began seeding the tournament with the 1979 edition.

Bold indicates national champion
The 2020 NCAA Division I men's basketball tournament was canceled March 12, 2020 due to the COVID-19 pandemic in the United States.

Pac-10/12 Tournament Seeding

Bold indicates tournament champion

NIT results
The Ducks have appeared in 13 National Invitation Tournaments. Their combined record is 17–13.

CBI results
The Ducks have appeared in one College Basketball Invitational. Their record is 5–1 and were the 2011 champions.

Record vs. Pac-12 opponents 
All-time series includes non-conference matchups and Pac-12 Tournament results.

Oregon men's basketball players in professional teams

Roman Sorkin (born 1996), Israeli basketball player in the Israeli Basketball Premier League
 Jamil Wilson (born 1990), basketball player for Hapoel Jerusalem in the Israeli Basketball Premier League

References

External links

 

 
1902 establishments in Oregon